Drahonice is a municipality and village in Strakonice District in the South Bohemian Region of the Czech Republic. It has about 400 inhabitants.

Administrative parts
The village of Albrechtice is an administrative part of Drahonice.

References

Villages in Strakonice District